Vicente Arsenal (born 10 July 1948) is a Filipino former boxer. He competed in the men's light flyweight event at the 1972 Summer Olympics.

He later went on to become a coach for other Filipino amateur boxers competing for the Philippines in international competitions. He served as coach for Filipino boxers in the 2003 Southeast Asian Games with Elmer Pamisa as his assistant.

Arsenal also served in the Philippine Navy.

References

External links
 

1948 births
Living people
Filipino male boxers
Olympic boxers of the Philippines
Boxers at the 1972 Summer Olympics
Place of birth missing (living people)
Light-flyweight boxers